A web browser is a software application for retrieving, presenting and traversing information resources on the World Wide Web. It further provides for the capture or input of information which may be returned to the presenting system, then stored or processed as necessary.  The method of accessing a particular page or content is achieved by entering its address, known as a Uniform Resource Identifier or URI.  This may be a web page, image, video, or other piece of content. Hyperlinks present in resources enable users easily to navigate their browsers to related resources.
A web browser can also be defined as an application software or program designed to enable users to access, retrieve and view documents and other resources on the Internet.

Precursors to the web browser emerged in the form of hyperlinked applications during the mid and late 1980s, and following these, Tim Berners-Lee is credited with developing, in 1990, both the first web server, and the first web browser, called WorldWideWeb (no spaces) and later renamed Nexus. Many others were soon developed, with Marc Andreessen's 1993 Mosaic (later Netscape), being particularly easy to use and install, and often credited with sparking the internet boom of the 1990s. Today, the major web browsers are Chrome, Safari, Internet Explorer, Firefox, Opera, and Edge.

The explosion in popularity of the Web was triggered in September 1993 by NCSA Mosaic, a graphical browser which eventually ran on several popular office and home computers. This was the first web browser aiming to bring multimedia content to non-technical users, and therefore included images and text on the same page, unlike previous browser designs; its founder, Marc Andreessen, also established the company that in 1994, released Netscape Navigator, which resulted in one of the early browser wars, when it ended up in a competition for dominance (which it lost) with Microsoft's Internet Explorer (for Windows).

Precursors 
In 1984, expanding on ideas from futurist Ted Nelson, Neil Larson's commercial DOS Maxthink outline program added angle bracket hypertext jumps (adopted by later web browsers) to and from ASCII, batch, and other Maxthink files up to 32 levels deep. In 1986, he released his DOS Houdini knowledge network program that supported 2500 topics cross-connected with 7500 links in each file along with hypertext links among unlimited numbers of external ASCII, batch, and other Houdini files, these capabilities were included in his then popular shareware DOS file browser programs HyperRez (memory resident) and PC Hypertext (which also added jumps to programs, editors, graphic files containing hot spots jumps, and cross-linked thesaurus/glossary files). These programs introduced many to the browser concept and 20 years later, Google still lists 3,000,000 references to PC Hypertext. In 1989, Larson created both HyperBBS and HyperLan which both allow multiple users to create/edit both topics and jumps for information and knowledge annealing which, in concept, the columnist John C. Dvorak says pre-dated Wiki by many years.

From 1987 on, Neil Larson also created TransText (hypertext word processor) and many utilities for rapidly building large scale knowledge systems. In 1989, his software helped produce, for one of the big eight accounting firms, a comprehensive knowledge system (integrated litigation knowledge system) of integrating all accounting laws/regulations into a CDROM containing 50,000 files with 200,000 hypertext jumps. Additionally, the Lynx (a very early web-based browser) development history notes their project origin was based on the browser concepts from Neil Larson and Maxthink. In 1989, he declined joining the Mosaic browser team with his preference for knowledge/wisdom creation over distributing information ... a problem he says is still not solved by today's internet.

Another early browser, Silversmith, was created by John Bottoms in 1986. The browser, based on SGML tags, used a tag set from the Electronic Document Project of the AAP with minor modifications and was sold to a number of early adopters. At the time SGML was used exclusively for the formatting of printed documents. The use of SGML for electronically displayed documents signaled a shift in electronic publishing and was met with considerable resistance. Silversmith included an integrated indexer, full text searches, hypertext links between images text and sound using SGML tags and a return stack for use with hypertext links. It included features that are still not available in today's browsers. These include capabilities such as the ability to restrict searches within document structures, searches on indexed documents using wild cards and the ability to search on tag attribute values and attribute names.

Peter Scott and Earle Fogel expanded the earlier HyperRez (1988) concept in creating HyTelnet in 1990 which added jumps to telnet sites ... and which offered users instant logon and access to the online catalogs of over 5000 libraries around the world. The strength of Hytelnet was speed and simplicity in link creation/execution at the expense of a centralized worldwide source for adding, indexing, and modifying telnet links. This problem was solved by the invention of the web server.

In April 1990, a draft patent application for a mass market consumer device for browsing pages via links "PageLink" was proposed by Craig Cockburn at Digital Equipment Corporation (DEC) whilst working in their Networking and Communications division in Reading, England. This application for a keyboardless touch screen browser for consumers also makes reference to "navigating and searching text" and "bookmarks" was aimed at (quotes paraphrased) "replacing books", "storing a shopping list" "have an updated personalised newspaper updated round the clock", "dynamically updated maps for use in a car" and suggests such a device could have a "profound effect on the advertising industry". The patent was canned by Digital as too futuristic and, being largely hardware based, had obstacles to market that purely software driven approaches lacked.

Early 1990s: world wide web  

The first web browser, WorldWideWeb, was developed in 1990 by Tim Berners-Lee for the NeXT Computer (at the same time as the first web server for the same machine) and introduced to his colleagues at CERN in March 1991. Berners-Lee recruited Nicola Pellow, a math student intern working at CERN, to write the Line Mode Browser, a cross-platform web browser that displayed web-pages on old terminals and was released in May 1991.

In 1992, Tony Johnson released the MidasWWW browser. Based on Motif/X, MidasWWW allowed viewing of PostScript files on the Web from Unix and VMS, and even handled compressed PostScript. Another early popular Web browser was ViolaWWW, which was modeled after HyperCard. In the same year the Lynx browser was announced – the only one of these early projects still being maintained and supported today. Erwise was the first browser with a graphical user interface, developed as a student project at Helsinki University of Technology and released in April 1992, but discontinued in 1994.

Thomas R. Bruce of the Legal Information Institute at Cornell Law School started 1992, to develop Cello. When released on 8 June 1993 it was one of the first graphical web browsers, and the first to run on Windows: Windows 3.1, NT 3.5, and OS/2.

However, the explosion in popularity of the Web was triggered by NCSA Mosaic which was a graphical browser running originally on Unix and soon ported to the Amiga and VMS platforms, and later the Apple Macintosh and Microsoft Windows platforms. Version 1.0 was released in September 1993, and was dubbed the killer application of the Internet. It was the first web browser to display images inline with the document's text. Prior browsers would display an icon that, when clicked, would download and open the graphic file in a helper application. This was an intentional design decision on both parts, as the graphics support in early browsers was intended for displaying charts and graphs associated with technical papers while the user scrolled to read the text, while Mosaic was trying to bring multimedia content to non-technical users. Mosaic and browsers derived from it had a user option to automatically display images inline or to show an icon for opening in external programs. Marc Andreessen, who was the leader of the Mosaic team at NCSA, quit to form a company that would later be known as Netscape Communications Corporation. Netscape released its flagship Navigator product in October 1994, and it took off the next year.

IBM presented its own WebExplorer with OS/2 Warp in 1994 and version 1.0 was released 6 January 1995.

UdiWWW was the first web browser that was able to handle all HTML 3 features with the math tags released 1995. Following the release of version 1.2 in April 1996, Bernd Richter ceased development, stating "let Microsoft with the ActiveX Development Kit do the rest."

Microsoft, which had thus far not marketed a browser, finally entered the fray with its Internet Explorer product (version 1.0 was released 16 August 1995), purchased from Spyglass, Inc. This began what is known as the "browser wars" in which Microsoft and Netscape competed for the Web browser market.

Early web users were free to choose among the handful of web browsers available, just as they would choose any other application—web standards would ensure their experience remained largely the same. The browser wars put the Web in the hands of millions of ordinary PC users, but showed how commercialization of the Web could stymie standards efforts. Both Microsoft and Netscape liberally incorporated proprietary extensions to HTML in their products, and tried to gain an edge by product differentiation, leading to a web by the late 1990s where only Microsoft or Netscape browsers were viable contenders. In a victory for a standardized web, Cascading Style Sheets, proposed by Håkon Wium Lie, were accepted over Netscape's JavaScript Style Sheets (JSSS) by W3C.

Late 1990s: Microsoft vs Netscape 
In 1996, Netscape's share of the browser market reached 86% (with Internet Explorer edging up 10%); but then Microsoft began integrating its browser with its operating system and bundling deals with OEMs. Within 4 years of its release IE had 75% of the browser market and by 1999 it had 99% of the market. Although Microsoft has since faced antitrust litigation on these charges, the browser wars effectively ended once it was clear that Netscape's declining market share trend was irreversible. Prior to the release of Mac OS X, Internet Explorer for Mac and Netscape were also the primary browsers in use on the Macintosh platform.

Unable to continue commercially funding their product's development, Netscape responded by open sourcing its product, creating Mozilla. This helped the browser maintain its technical edge over Internet Explorer, but did not slow Netscape's declining market share. Netscape was purchased by America Online in late 1998.

2000s 

At first, the Mozilla project struggled to attract developers, but by 2002, it had evolved into a relatively stable and powerful internet suite. Mozilla 1.0 was released to mark this milestone. Also in 2002, a spinoff project that would eventually become the popular Firefox was released.

Firefox was always downloadable for free from the start, as was its predecessor, the Mozilla browser. Firefox's business model, unlike the business model of 1990s Netscape, primarily consists of doing deals with search engines such as Google to direct users towards them – see Web browser#Business models.

In 2003, Microsoft announced that Internet Explorer would no longer be made available as a separate product but would be part of the evolution of its Windows platform, and that no more releases for the Macintosh would be made.

AOL announced that it would retire support and development of the Netscape web browser in February 2008.

In the second half of 2004, Internet Explorer reached a peak market share of more than 92%. Since then, its market share has been slowly but steadily declining and is around 11.8% as of July 2013. In early 2005, Microsoft reversed its decision to release Internet Explorer as part of Windows, announcing that a standalone version of Internet Explorer was under development. Internet Explorer 7 was released for Windows XP, Windows Server 2003, and Windows Vista in October 2006. Internet Explorer 8 was released on 19 March 2009, for Windows XP, Windows Server 2003, Windows Vista, Windows Server 2008, and Windows 7. Internet Explorer 9, 10 and 11 were later released, and version 11 is included in Windows 10, but Microsoft Edge became the default browser there.

Apple's Safari, the default browser on Mac OS X from version 10.3 onwards, has grown to dominate browsing on Mac OS X. Browsers such as Firefox, Camino, Google Chrome, and OmniWeb are alternative browsers for Mac systems. OmniWeb and Google Chrome, like Safari, use the WebKit rendering engine (forked from KHTML), which is packaged by Apple as a framework for use by third-party applications. In August 2007, Apple also ported Safari for use on the Windows XP and Vista operating systems.

Opera was first released in 1996. It was a popular choice in handheld devices, particularly mobile phones, but remains a niche player in the PC Web browser market. It was also available on Nintendo's DS, DS Lite and Wii consoles. The Opera Mini browser uses the Presto layout engine like all versions of Opera, but runs on most phones supporting Java MIDlets.

The Lynx browser remains popular for Unix shell users and with vision impaired users due to its entirely text-based nature. There are also several text-mode browsers with advanced features, such as w3m, Links (which can operate both in text and graphical mode), and the Links forks such as ELinks.

Relationships of browsers 
A number of web browsers have been derived and branched from source code of earlier versions and products.

Web browsers by year

Historical web browsers 
This table focuses on operating system (OS) and browsers of the 1990 to 2000. The year listed for a version is usually the year of the first official release, with an end year being end of development, project change, or relevant termination. Releases of OS and browser from the early 1990s to before 2001–02 time frame are the current focus.

Many early browsers can be made to run on later OS (and later browsers on early OS in some cases); however, most of these situations are avoided in the table. Terms are defined below.

See also 
 Comparison of web browsers
 History of the Internet
 History of the World Wide Web
 Timeline of web browsers
 List of web browsers
 Usage share of web browsers

References

External links 

 evolt.org – Browser Archive

 
Web browser
Web browser
History of computing